Mini football may refer to:

 Five-a-side football, or 6x6, 7x7, 8x8 variations, run by World Minifootball Federation. WMF replaced Federación Internacional de Fútbol Rápido (FIFRA).
 Jorkyball, 2x2 format of football played in a plexiglass cage of 50 sq mt. The walls can be used to pass and score.
 Small-sided football 6x6, 7x7, 8x8 variations, run by International Socca Federation
 Minifootball, indoor football played in a walled arena, such as an ice-hockey rink
 Futsal, a ball sport played on a hard court
 Mini-futbol, alternate name (mainly in Russian) for futsal
 Mini-football (Dutch: minivoetbal), a five-a-side indoor football game, played in Flanders
 Table football, table-top game that is loosely based on football